Autonomy for the region of Macedonia  and Adrianople Thrace within the Ottoman Empire was a concept that arose in the late 19th century and was popular until ca. 1920. The plan was developed among Macedonian and Thracian Bulgarian emigres in Sofia and covered several meanings. Serbia and Greece were totally opposed to that set of ideas while Bulgaria was ambivalent to them. In fact Sofia advocated granting such autonomy as a prelude to the annexation of both areas, as for many Bulgarian emigres it was seen in the same way.

History 
The concept was popularized in 1894 by the statute of the Internal Macedonian-Adrianople Revolutionary Organization with its demand for political autonomy of these areas. Initially its  membership was restricted only for Bulgarians. It was active in Macedonia, but also in Thrace (the Vilayet of Adrianople). At the eve of the 20th century, it changed its exclusively Bulgarian character and opened it to all Macedonians and Thracians regardless of their nationality. The Organization gave a guarantee for the preservation of the rights of all national communities there. Those revolutionaries saw the future autonomous Macedono-Adrianople Ottoman province as a multinational polity. Another Bulgarian organisation called Supreme Macedonian-Adrianople Revolutionary Committee also had as its official aim the struggle for autonomy of Macedonia and Adrianople regions. Its earliest documents referring to the autonomy of Macedonia were the Decisions of the First Macedonian Congress in Sofia in 1895.

This scenario was partially facilitated by the Treaty of Berlin (1878), according to which Macedonia and Adrianople areas were given back from Bulgaria to the Ottomans, but especially by its unrealized 23rd. article, which promised future autonomy for unspecified territories in then European Turkey, settled with Christian population. This trend emphasized the principle of popular sovereignty, and appealed for a democratic constitution and further decentralization and local autonomy within the Ottoman Empire. In general, an autonomous status was presumed to imply a special kind of constitution of the region, a reorganization of gendarmerie, broader representation of the local Christians in all the administration, etc. However, there was not a clear political agenda behind this idea and its final outcome, after the expected dissolution of the Ottoman Empire.

By many IMARO and SMAC activists the autonomy was seen as a transitional step towards possible unification of both areas with Bulgaria. This outcome was based on the example of short-lived Eastern Rumelia. The successful unification between the Principality of Bulgaria and this Ottoman province in 1885 was to be followed. The second possible option for the development of the autonomy was as a first step towards a future inclusion into an imagined Balkan Federation.

During the Balkan Wars (1912–1913) and the First World War (1914–1918) the organizations supported the Bulgarian army and joined to Bulgarian war-time authorities when they took control over parts of Thrace and Macedonia. In this period autonomist ideas were abandoned and the direct incorporation of occupied areas into Bulgaria was supported. These wars left both areas divided mainly between Greece, Serbia (later Yugoslavia), and the Ottoman Empire (later Turkey). That resulted in the final decline of the autonomist concept. After that the combined Macedonian-Adrianopolitan revolutionary movement split into two detached organizations – the Internal Macedonian Revolutionary Organisation and  the Internal Thracian Revolutionary Organisation.

In 1919 the so-called Temporary representation of the former United Internal Revolutionary Organization founded by former members of the IMARO,  issued a memorandum and send it to the representatives of the Great Powers on the Peace conference in Paris. They advocated for autonomy of Macedonia as a part of a future Balkan Federation. Following the signing of the Treaty of Neuilly and the partition of Macedonia, the activity of the Temporary representation faded and in 1920 it was dissolved. The former IMRO revolutionary and member of the Temporary representation Dimo Hadzhidimov wrote in his brochure "Back to the Autonomy" in 1919:"This idea, nevertheless, remained a Bulgarian idea until it disappeared even among the Bulgarians. Neither the Greeks, nor the Turks, nor any other nationality in Macedonia accepted that slogan... The idea of autonomous Macedonia was developed most significantly after the creation of the Internal Macedonan revolutionary Organization which was Bulgarian in respect of its members and proved to be well decided, of great military might and power of resistance. The leadership of the Macedonian Greeks could not rally under the banner of such an organization which would not, under any circumstances, serve Hellenism as a national ideal... Undoubtedly, since the Greeks of Macedonia, the second largest group following the Bulgarians, had a position like this vis-a-vis the idea of autonomy, the latter could hardly anticipate success."

See also 
 Autonomism (political doctrine)
 Macedonia for the Macedonians
 Independent Macedonia (IMRO)
 Independent Macedonia (1944)

Notes 

History of the Ottoman Empire
Proposed countries
History of Macedonia (region)
History of Thrace